John Tumminello, better known as Johnny Rod (December 8, 1957), is an American bass guitar and guitar player. He is best known as a former bassist of the American heavy metal band, W.A.S.P.

Tumminello grew up in St. Louis, Missouri. According to his own statements, he started performing at the age of 11. One of the bands he played with was King Kobra, from 1983 to 1986.

In 1986, Rod received an offer to join the heavy metal band, W.A.S.P. His main bass at that time, was a yellow B.C. Rich Ironbird. He played on the albums Inside the Electric Circus (1986), Live... in the Raw (1987) and The Headless Children (1989) and accompanied the band on their 1992 farewell tour. Later attempts for a reunion of the classic line-up failed, mainly due to singer Lawless, according to Rod, as well as the rest of the members of W.A.S.P. during that era.

In 2010, he reunited with King Kobra. The band went on hiatus after two album releases in 2013, and reunited again in 2016 for several live performances.

In 2017, Rod collaborated with Carmine Appice on "Monsters and Heroes", a tribute cover song to Ronnie James Dio.

Rod has used both Fender and B.C. Rich basses during his career. He lists the Fender Precision bass is his all-time favorite guitar.

References

American heavy metal guitarists
American heavy metal bass guitarists
Rhythm guitarists
King Kobra members
W.A.S.P. members
Living people
1957 births
20th-century American bass guitarists